Bash Fahad Mutumba is a Ugandan photographer, poet and digital content creator.  He is best known for his sensual type of photography.   Mutumba started his journey of professional photography at Galaxy FM, Kampala; before specializing in boudoir photography.

Early life and education background
He grew up in Kampala.     He graduated with a Bachelor in Commerce from Makerere University in 2020.

Career
Mutumba has served as a digital content creator for Campus Bee Uganda, Galaxy FM, MTN Uganda,  DFCU bank, Nile Breweries, Coca-Cola in form of articles and photography.

He worked as an apprentice  in photography, videography and a voiceover works at Galaxy FM. Mutumba's work has appeared in various magazines both in Uganda and internationally.     In 2016, started poetry and took part in Babishai Niwe Poetry Foundation 2017    In March 2021, Mutumba signed a book deal with Kitara Nation to publish his poetry collection.   He mentions Oscar Ntege as his inspiration.

Awards
1st Runner-up at Babishai Niwe Poetry Foundation 2017.

References

External links
Bash Mutumba on Instagram

Ugandan photographers
21st-century photographers
21st-century Ugandan poets
Ugandan short story writers
Makerere University alumni
1996 births
Living people